USS Hornbill (AMc-13) was a coastal minesweeper of the United States Navy, named  after the hornbill.

The ship was launched as the fishing boat J. A. Martinolich in 1938 by the Martinolich Repair Basin, Tacoma, Washington. She was taken over by the Navy, and commissioned on 7 December 1940.

West Coast assignment 
Hornbill was assigned to the mine force in the 12th Naval District. She engaged in coastal sweeping of the main ship channel for magnetic and acoustic type mines. After the attack on Pearl Harbor, her service became more valuable with the Japanese threat to U.S. West Coast sea traffic.

Collision and sinking 
Approximately thirty minutes after the collision the minesweeper sank. The crew was saved and a small amount of equipment was safely removed to the lumber schooner. She was stricken from the Naval Vessel Register on 24 July 1942.

References

External links
 
 Casualties: U.S. Navy and Coast Guard Vessels, Sunk or Damaged Beyond Repair during World War II, 7 December 1941-1 October 1945 
 Ships of the U.S. Navy, 1940-1945
 Mine Warfare Vessels

 

Ships built in Tacoma, Washington
1938 ships
Minesweepers of the United States Navy
World War II minesweepers of the United States
World War II shipwrecks in the Pacific Ocean
Shipwrecks of the California coast
Ships sunk in collisions
Maritime incidents in June 1942